Sand Point is a peninsula that juts into Lake Washington from north Seattle, Washington, United States. It is mostly occupied by Magnuson Park and gives its name to the Sand Point neighborhood to the west. Formerly a U.S. naval air station, it is mostly public park area, but with a portion occupied by NOAA.

Sand Point was used as a game location in The X-Files Game.

Landforms of Seattle
Peninsulas of Washington (state)
Landforms of King County, Washington